The 2018–19 Liga I (also known as Liga 1 Betano for sponsorship reasons) was the 101st season of the Liga I, the top professional league for Romanian association football clubs. The season began on 20 July 2018 and ended on 2 June 2019, being the fourth to take place since the play-off/play-out rule has been introduced. 

Dunărea Călărași and Hermannstadt joined as the promoted clubs from the 2017–18 Liga II. CFR Cluj managed to defend the title for the first time in their history, while FCSB became the first team in the country to finish as runner-ups for four consecutive seasons in a row.

Teams
The league consists of 14 teams: twelve teams from the 2017–18 Liga I and two new teams from the 2017–18 Liga II. 

Teams promoted to the Liga I

The first club to be promoted was Dunărea Călărași, following their 3–1 win against Ripensia Timișoara on 5 May 2018. Dunărea will play in the Liga I for the first time in their history.

The second club to be promoted was Hermannstadt, following their 1–1 draw against Chindia Târgoviște on 13 May 2018. Hermannstadt will play in the Liga I for the first time in their history, but the city of Sibiu, which had many different teams over time, returned in the Liga I after six years of absence, where was last time represented by Voința Sibiu.

Teams relegated to the Liga II

The first club to be relegated was Juventus București, which were relegated on 22 May 2018 following a 1–3 defeat against Concordia Chiajna, ending their 1-year stay in the top flight.

The second club to be relegated was Poli Timișoara, which were relegated on 2 June 2018 following their 1–0 win against Concordia Chiajna, ending their 3-year stay in the top flight.

Venues

Personnel and kits

Note: Flags indicate national team as has been defined under FIFA eligibility rules. Players and Managers may hold more than one non-FIFA nationality.

Managerial changes

Regular season
In the regular season the 14 teams will meet twice, a total of 26 matches per team, with the top 6 advancing to the Championship round and the bottom 8 qualifying for Relegation round.

Table

Results

Positions by round

Championship play-offs
The top six teams from Regular season will meet twice (10 matches per team) for places in 2019–20 UEFA Champions League and 2019–20 UEFA Europa League as well as deciding the league champion. Teams start the Championship round with their points from the Regular season halved, rounded upwards, and no other records carried over from the Regular season.

Table

Results

Positions by round

Relegation play-outs
The bottom eight teams from regular season met twice (14 matches per team) to contest against relegation. Teams started the Relegation round with their points from the Regular season halved, rounded upwards, and no other records carried over from the Regular season. The winner of the Relegation round finished 7th in the overall season standings, the second placed team – 8th, and so on, with the last placed team in the Relegation round being 14th.

Table

Results

Positions by round

Promotion/relegation play-offs
The 12th-placed team of the Liga I faced the 3rd-placed team of the Liga II.

|}

Season statistics

Top scorers
Updated to matches played on 2 June 2019.

1 Alexandru Mitriță was transferred to New York City during the winter transfer window.

Hat-tricks

Clean sheets
Updated to matches played on 2 June 2019.

Discipline
Updated 2 June 2019

Player
Most yellow cards: 15
 Alexandru Răuță (Voluntari)

Most red cards: 3
 Emmanuel Culio (CFR Cluj)

Club
Most yellow cards: 130
Concordia Chiajna
Most red cards: 8
Astra Giurgiu
FCSB
Gaz Metan Mediaș

Attendances

Champion squad

Awards

Liga I Team of the Regular Season

Liga I Team of the Championship play-offs

Liga I Team of the Season

References

External links
 

2018-19
2018–19 in Romanian football
ro